On Stage is a Canadian music variety television series which aired on CBC Television from 1954 to 1955.

Premise
George Murray hosted this variety series for most of its run, with mid-1955 episodes hosted by Denny Vaughan and Joan Fairfax. Series regulars included Jack Kane's orchestra, the Bill Brady Quartet, with singers Terry Dale, Phyllis Marshall and Wally Koster. John Aylesworth and Frank Peppiatt, later of Hee Haw, were the series scriptwriters, developing comedy segments which featured Alfie Scopp, Reuben Ship, Al Bertram, and Jill Foster.  Lever Brothers was the series sponsor.

Scheduling
This half-hour series was broadcast for a full season on Wednesdays at 9:30 p.m. (Eastern) from 6 October 1954 to 1 June 1955, then in the same day and time slot from 6 July to 21 September 1955. After an episode on 19 September 1955, it was broadcast for a short run in the next season, Mondays at 8:30 p.m. from 26 September to 24 October 1955 then replaced in that time slot with The Denny Vaughan Show.

See also
 The Big Revue.

References

External links
 
 

CBC Television original programming
1950s Canadian music television series
1950s Canadian variety television series
1954 Canadian television series debuts
1955 Canadian television series endings
Black-and-white Canadian television shows